Syntretus elegans is a species of parasitic wasps of adult bumblebees. It is found in Europe.

References 

 Syntretus elegans at fauna-eu.org

Euphorinae
Insects described in 1856